Dayton is an unincorporated community and census-designated place (CDP) in Lake County, Montana, United States. The population was 84 at the 2010 census.

Geography
Dayton is located in northwestern Lake County at  (47.864979, -114.276835), on the northwest shore of Flathead Lake, north of its Big Arm. U.S. Route 93 runs along the northern and western edges of the community, leading north  to Kalispell and south  to Polson, the Lake county seat.

Demographics

As of the census of 2000, there were 95 people, 48 households, and 28 families residing in the CDP. The population density was 177.0 people per square mile (67.9/km2). There were 100 housing units at an average density of 186.3/sq mi (71.5/km2). The racial makeup of the CDP was 93.68% White, 3.16% Native American, and 3.16% from two or more races.

There were 48 households, out of which 8.3% had children under the age of 18 living with them, 58.3% were married couples living together, and 39.6% were non-families. 31.3% of all households were made up of individuals, and 14.6% had someone living alone who was 65 years of age or older. The average household size was 1.98 and the average family size was 2.45.

In the CDP, the population was spread out, with 8.4% under the age of 18, 4.2% from 18 to 24, 17.9% from 25 to 44, 45.3% from 45 to 64, and 24.2% who were 65 years of age or older. The median age was 54 years. For every 100 females, there were 86.3 males. For every 100 females age 18 and over, there were 81.3 males.

The median income for a household in the CDP was $33,125, and the median income for a family was $42,500. Males had a median income of $15,833 versus $15,417 for females. The per capita income for the CDP was $18,501. None of the population and none of the families were below the poverty line.

References

Census-designated places in Lake County, Montana
Census-designated places in Montana